National Road I-6 is a major road in Southern Bulgaria. It runs from Gyueshevo at the border with North Macedonia and Burgas on the Black Sea coast.

Description

The starting point of Road I-6 is the Gyueshevo border crossing at the border with North Macedonia. It descends and bypasses Kyustendil, crosses the Konyavska mountain and then passes through the centre of Radomir. Between Radomir and Pernik, Road I-6 runs as a four-lane dual carriageway road.

It continues to Sofia, the capital of Bulgaria, passing through the Vladaya pass. This section is also scheduled for upgrade. Road I-6 joins the south and east sides of the Sofia ringroad and then continues south of the Balkan mountains up to the city of Sliven. The road then passes through Karnobat and Aytos before turning south-east to reach Burgas, the fourth largest city in Bulgaria situated on the Black Sea coast.

References

External links
Road network of Bulgaria RIA

Roads in Bulgaria